Denis Tillinac (26 May 1947 – 26 September 2020) was a French writer and journalist.

Biography
As a writer, he received the following literary prizes: Prix de la Table ronde française (1982), Prix Roger Nimier (1983), Prix Kléber-Haedens (1987), Prix Jacques-Chardonne (1990), Prix du roman populiste (1993), Grand prix de littérature sportive (1993), Prix Paul-Léautaud (1999).

He wrote a weekly column in Valeurs actuelles.

He was close to Jacques Chirac. In 2012, he wrote an open letter to Marine Le Pen to ask her to support Nicolas Sarkozy in the second round of the presidential election.

He was a Catholic and wrote books about the Catholic origins of France.

Tillinac died on 26 September 2020 at the age of 73.

List of publications
Les Corréziens, (with Pierre Dauzier, Robert Laffont, 1991)
En désespoir de causes
Le mystère Simenon
L'Ange du désordre
Elvis : Balade sudiste
Je nous revois...
Le Bonheur à Souillac
Le rêveur d'Amériques
Sur les pas de Chateaubriand
Boulevard des Maréchaux
L'Irlandaise du Dakar
Chirac le Gaulois
Le Jeu et la Chandelle (1994)
Dernier verre au Danton (1996)
Don Juan (1998)
Ou va le monde? (co-author with Alain Finkielkraut and Jean-Claude Guillebaud, 2000)
Le Dieu de nos pères, défense du catholicisme (Bayard Presse, 2004)
Dictionnaire amoureux de la France (with Alain Bouldouyre, Plon, 2008)
Rue Corneille (Editions de La Table Ronde, 2009)
Femmes de guerre, texte in Inconnues corréziennes, résonances d'écrivains. (co-author, Editions Libel, 2009)
Dictionnaire amoureux du catholicisme (Plon, 2011)
Considérations inactuelles (Plon, 2012)

References

1947 births
2020 deaths
20th-century French journalists
21st-century French journalists
French publishers (people)
20th-century French essayists
French political writers
Roman Catholic writers
French political commentators
Roger Nimier Prize winners
Writers from Paris
French Roman Catholics
20th-century French male writers
French male non-fiction writers